Monika is a 1937 operetta by Nico Dostal to a libretto by Hermann Hermecke. The premiere was 3 October 1937 in Stuttgart.

Recording
Selections on Nico Dostal dirigiert sein beliebtesten Operetten - Die ungarische Hochzeit, Manina, Clivia, Monika, Eurodisc LP

References

1937 operas
Operas by Nico Dostal
Operas
German-language operettas